Notable people from Aldershot include:

A
 Holly Aird - actress
 John Antrobus - playwright and script writer
 Claude Auchinleck - Field Marshal

B
 Peter Baldwin - Australian politician 
 Kelly Bell - glamour model
 John Belling -  cytogeneticist
 Graham Benstead - footballer 
 Amelle Berrabah - Sugababes musician
 Johnny Berry - footballer and 'Busby Babe'
 Noel Brett - cricketer 
 Jason "J" Brown - former member of the boy band Five
 Alan Burton - footballer
Barry Blankley-( footballer

C
 Dave Carter - British powerlifter
 Bob Catley - musician, singer from band Magnum
 Ronald Cavaye - classical pianist and writer 
 Kathryn Cave, children's author 
 Maureen Chadwick - screenwriter and dramatist 
 A. Bertram Chandler - science-fiction writer 
 Michael Chappell - military writer and illustrator
 Chris Chittell - actor in Emmerdale
 Hedley Churchward - scene painter and early British convert to Islam
 Denise Coffey - actress
 Francis Lyon Cohen - first Jewish chaplain in the British Army
 Alan Comfort - footballer 
 Ian Crosby - cricketer

D
 Louisa Daniell - philanthropist
 Joseph Darracott - art historian and writer
 Libby Davies - Canadian politician, New Democratic Party MP for Vancouver East
 Norman "Dinky" Diamond - drummer in the 1970s with Sparks

E
 Arthur English - actor
 Richard Eve - local solicitor and Grand Treasurer of the United Grand Lodge of England in 1889
 Eamon Everall - artist and educator

F
 Desmond Fitzpatrick - general 
 Mark Foran - footballer 
 Russell Foster - professor of circadian neuroscience and Nicholas Kurti Senior Fellow at Brasenose College at the University of Oxford
 George Malcolm Fox - Inspector of Gymnasia for the British Army (1890-1897, 1900–1902)
 Martin Freeman - actor

G
 Maud Gonne - Irish revolutionary; muse of William Butler Yeats
 Ernest Spiteri-Gonzi - footballer

H
 David Haig - actor
 T. J. Hamblin - formerly professor of immunohaematology at the University of Southampton
 Frederick Hammersley - Major-General and first Inspector of Gymnasia in the British Army 
 Terry Hands - theatre director who founded the Liverpool Everyman Theatre and ran the Royal Shakespeare Company for 13 years
 Jeremy Hardy - comedian
 Janet Henfrey - actress 
 John Raymond Hobbs - pioneer in clinical immunology, protein biochemistry and bone marrow transplantation, specifically in child health
 Ann Hunt and Elizabeth Hamel - longest separated twins
 Jon Hotten - author 
 Peter Howard - aviation physician 
 Tom Hunter - winner of the Victoria Cross during World War II

J
 Henry Jelf - cricketer and naval officer 
 Sam Jepp - footballer 
 Joe Jopling - footballer

K
 Herminie Templeton Kavanagh - British - Irish - American writer
 Ted Keating - New Zealand politician
 Nicole Koolen - Dutch field hockey player

L
 Mark Lane - cricketer and coach 
 Humphrey de Verd Leigh - RAF officer and inventor
 Lisa-Jayne Lewis - Eurovision Song Contest commentator and broadcaster
 Kathleen Lindsay - novelist 
 John Lloyd - Canadian politician
 Michael Lockett - soldier
 Selden Long DSO, MC - British fighter ace during World War I
 Constance Loseby - Victorian actress and Gilbert and Sullivan performer

M
 Floyd Manderson - competed in the 1988 Summer Olympics
 Simon Mann - mercenary
 George Martin - comedian
 Craig Maskell - footballer
 Ian McEwan - novelist
 Stephen McKay - Distinguished Professor in Social Research at the University of Lincoln.
 Dan Middleton - British professional gamer, YouTuber and author. He is best known as DanTDM
 Heather Mills - former wife of Paul McCartney
 Mickie Most - record producer

N
 Frank Neary - footballer
 Gordon Neilson - Scottish rugby football player and Army officer
 Nigel Neilson - actor
 James Newcome - Anglican bishop

O
 Michael O'Neill - poet, academic and Head of the Department of English Studies at Durham University

P
 Brian Perry - American ice hockey player
 Seamus Perry - Fellow of Balliol College, Oxford and a Professor in the English Faculty at the University of Oxford since 2014.
 Sir Robert Pringle - Principal Veterinary Officer at Aldershot Command 1908 to 1910

R
 Joe Ralls - footballer
 Alex Reid - MMA fighter and television personality
 Bruce Rioch - former professional footballer, now manager
 Stella Ross-Craig - botanical artist

S
 John Shearman - art historian
 Randall Swingler -poet
 Edgar Sheldrake - cricketer
^ Aaron Shingler - rugby union player
 Janet 'Rusty' Skuse - Britain's most tattooed woman
 Digby Smith - author and military historian
 George D. W. Smith - materials scientist
 Sydney Philip Smith - World War I flying ace
 Tim Spicer - arms dealer
 Clive Strutt - composer

T
 Charles Tannock - politician
 Nanavira Thera - Buddhist monk
 Alfred Toye - recipient of the Victoria Cross
 Wayne Turner - kickboxer
 Stephanie Twell - athlete

W
 James Wade - darts player
 Brian Walsh - footballer
 Daniel Welch - racing driver
 Davie Weir - 19th-century footballer
 John White - Lord Mayor of London
 Edward Whitehead - former Royal Navy officer better known for advertising Schweppes tonic water
 Tom Whittaker - footballer and manager
 George Williams - cricketer
 Joseph Willoughby - cricketer
 Dave Winfield (footballer) - footballer

V
 Charles Viner- jurist

Y
 Christopher Yates - cricketer
 Peter Yates - film director and producer

Notable animals from Aldershot
 Buster - war dog decorated for heroism

References

 
Aldershot
People from Aldershot